William Whistler (c. 1780 – 1863) served for over 60 years in the United States Army from 1801 to 1861.  His career was one of the longest in the history of the U.S. Army.  He was the uncle of the famous artist James Abbott McNeill Whistler.

Biography

Parents
He was the son of Major John Whistler (1748–1849) who served in the British Army during the American Revolution and it the United States Army from 1791 to 1815.  His mother was Anne Bishop Whistler (1748–1814).

Early career
Whistler was commissioned a 2nd Lieutenant in the 1st Infantry in June 1801 and was promoted to 1st lieutenant in 1807.  He was promoted to captain in December 1812.  When the Army was reorganized after the War of 1812 the 1st Infantry was re-designated as the 3rd Infantry.

He was brevetted to the rank of major in December 1822 for serving ten years in the same grade.  He was promoted to major and assigned to the 2nd Infantry in April 1826.  He became the lieutenant colonel of the 7th Infantry in July 1834.

Whistler became the colonel of the 4th Infantry in July 1845.  He retired from the Army in October 1861 and died on December 4, 1863.

Family
Colonel Whistler was the father of six children -

 John Harrison Whistler (1807–1873)
 Caroline Frances Whistler Bloodgood (1810–1893)
 Mary Ann Whistler Paul (1815–1871)
 Gwinthlean Harriet Whistler Kinzie (1818–1894)
 Brevet Brigadier General Joseph N. G. Whistler (1822–1899)
 Louise Ann Whistler Helm (1828–1883)
 
He was the brother of George Washington Whistler (1800–1849), a prominent civil engineer who was the father of the famous artist James Abbott McNeill Whistler.

References

1780 births
1863 deaths
United States Army officers